Ellen Pollock (29 June 1902 – 29 March 1997), daughter of Raymond Anselmo Pollak, an Austrian businessman, and Elsie Julia Harris, a New Zealander, was a British character actress who mainly appeared on stage in London's West End. She also appeared in several films and TV productions.

A devotee of Bernard Shaw, she was president of the Shaw Society from 1949. In their obituary, the Independent wrote "Pollock is believed to have played, in a career spanning 72 years, more Shavian heroines than anyone else. She directed London seasons of his plays; and it was during the London premiere of one of his lesser-known works – Farfetched Fables (Watergate, 1950) – that she announced Shaw's death from the stage."

Pollock's dedication to acting began as a seven-year-old, when she saw Sarah Bernhardt on stage; she knew then that she wanted to be an actress herself. Pollock was also a theatre director and a teacher of drama at RADA and Webber Douglas Academy of Dramatic Art; and her varied television work included several appearances in The Forsyte Saga for the BBC.

She outlived both husbands, Captain Leslie Hancock and the artist James Proudfoot. She had one child with Captain Hancock. Pollock was the subject of TV's This Is Your Life in 1992.

Ellen Pollock's stepmother, Hedwig Kahn, was the sister of Otto Hermann Kahn (wealthy investment banker, collector, philanthropist, and patron of the arts) and composer Robert Kahn.

Selected filmography

 Moulin Rouge (1928) - Girl
 Piccadilly (1929) - Vamp (uncredited)
 The Informer (1929) - Prostitute
 Too Many Crooks (1930, Short) - Rose
 Night Birds (1930) - Flossie
 Let's Love and Laugh (1931)
 The Wife's Family (1931) - Dolly White
 77 Park Lane (1931) - Minor role (uncredited)
 A Gentleman of Paris (1931) - (uncredited)
 Midnight (1931)
 The First Mrs. Fraser (1932) - Maid
 The Last Coupon (1932) - Eliza (uncredited)
 Heads We Go (1933) - Madame
 Channel Crossing (1933) - Minor Role
 Mister Cinders (1935) - Donna Lucia (uncredited)
 Royal Cavalcade (1935)
 It's a Bet (1935) - Mrs. Joe
 The Happy Family (1936) - Leo Hutt
 Aren't Men Beasts! (1937) - The Vamp
 The Street Singer (1937) - Gloria Weston
 Non-Stop New York (1937) - Miss Harvey
 Splinters in the Air (1937) - Charles' Wife
 Millions (1937) - Janet Mason (uncredited)
 Sons of the Sea (1939) - Margaret Hulls
 Spare a Copper (1940) - Lady Hardstaff
 Kiss the Bride Goodbye (1945) - Gladys Dodd
 Don Chicago (1945) - Lady Vanessa
 Bedelia (1946) - McKelvey's Housekeeper
 Warning to Wantons (1949) - Baroness de Jammes
 Something in the City (1950) - Mrs. Holley
 To Have and to Hold (1951) - Roberta
 The Galloping Major (1951) - Horsey Lady
 The Fake (1953) - Miss Fossett
 The Golden Link (1954) - Madame Sonia
 The Time of His Life (1955) - Lady Florence Carter-Wilson née Pastry
 Not So Dusty (1956) - Agatha
 The Hypnotist (1957) - Barbara Barton
 The Gypsy and the Gentleman (1958) - Haggard's Maid
 The Long Knife (1958) - Mrs. Cheam
 So Evil, So Young (1961) - Miss Smith
 Master Spy (1964) - Dr. Morrell
 Rapture (1965) - Landlady
 Who Killed the Cat? (1966) - Ruth Prendergast
 Finders Keepers (1966) - Grandma
 Horror Hospital (1973) - Aunt Harris
 The Wicked Lady (1983) - Mrs. Munce

References

External links
 

1902 births
1997 deaths
Actors from Heidelberg
British theatre directors
British stage actresses
British film actresses
Actresses from London
20th-century British actresses
German emigrants to the United Kingdom